Calamity Jane is a 1953 American Technicolor Western musical film directed by David Butler and starring Doris Day and Howard Keel. The musical numbers were staged and directed by Jack Donohue, who a year later would direct the Day musical, Lucky Me (1954). The film is loosely based on the life of Wild West heroine Calamity Jane (Doris Day) and explores an alleged romance between her and Wild Bill Hickok (Howard Keel).

Calamity Jane was devised by Warner Bros. in response to the success of the 1950 film Annie Get Your Gun, and won the Academy Award for Best Original Song for "Secret Love" (Sammy Fain and Paul Francis Webster), and was also Oscar-nominated for Best Music, Scoring of a Musical Picture (Ray Heindorf) and Best Sound, Recording (William A. Mueller).

The songs and screenplay would form the basis of a 1961 stage musical of the same name that has had a number of productions.

Plot

Dakota Territory, the 1870s. Tough-talking, hard-riding, straight-shooting Calamity Jane (Doris Day) has a crush on Lieutenant Gilmartin (Philip Carey). She even risks life and limb to single-handedly save him from an Indian war party. Meanwhile, Deadwood's saloon owner, who sends for beautiful women entertainers to sing on stage, mistakenly hires a male. Fearing a riot, the owner persuades the reluctant actor to perform in drag. Initially convincing, his wig falls off, and the angry audience threatens to tear the saloon down. But Calamity calms the situation, vowing to go to Chicago and bring the renowned singer Adelaid Adams (Gale Robbins) back to Deadwood. However, her friend Wild Bill Hickok (Howard Keel) expresses doubt, even scoffing at the idea. Calamity arrives in Chicago, where Adams is giving her farewell performance before launching a European tour. After the show ends, Adelaid gives her old costumes to her maid, Katie Brown (Allyn McLerie), who dreams of becoming a singer. Later, when Calamity walks in, she mistakes Katie for Adelaid. Katie, posing as Adelaid Adams, agrees to return west with Calamity, seeing it as a chance to perform on stage. But back in Deadwood, during Katie's premiere performance, stage fright gets the best of her. She bursts into tears, admitting she is not Adelaid Adams. With the stunned crowd on the verge of rioting, Calamity fires a shot in the air and defends Katie. She is allowed to carry on, and her confidence wins them over.

Katie moves into Calamity's ramshackle cabin which they fix up together. To attract Lt. Gilmartin, Calamity, with Katie's help, dresses and behaves "ladylike". But Gilmartin and Hickok both admire Katie. At one point, they draw straws to see who will take her to the upcoming ball. Lt. Gilmartin wins, and Wild Bill agrees to complement the double date by escorting Calamity. At the ball, everyone is awed by Calamity's transformation. She's beautiful. But she becomes increasingly jealous watching Katie and Gilmartin together. The ball ends when Calamity angrily confronts Katie, shooting a punch glass from her hand. A day later, though, Katie returns the favor at the saloon. Calamity, feeling humiliated, exits with Wild Bill and they drive off in his wagon. A heartbroken Calamity reveals her crush on Gilmartin, while Bill admits his love for Katie. Yet the scene is resolved when she and Bill passionately embrace and kiss. Calamity then realizes she loved Wild Bill all along. The next day, Katie takes the stagecoach to Chicago, feeling guilty over betraying her best friend. After the stage leaves, a furious Lt. Gilmartin confronts Calamity, blaming her for Katie's sudden departure. She responds by mounting her horse and riding out to overtake the stagecoach. There, she tells Katie she loves Wild Bill, and the two women are reunited. The story ends with a double wedding.

Cast
 Doris Day as Calamity Jane
 Howard Keel as Bill Hickok
 Allyn Ann McLerie as Katie Brown
 Philip Carey as Daniel Gilmartin
 Dick Wesson as Francis Fryer
 Paul Harvey as Henry Miller
 Chubby Johnson as Rattlesnake
 Gale Robbins as Adelaid Adams
Tom London  as Prospector (uncredited)

Music
The score, with music by Sammy Fain and lyrics by Paul Francis Webster, includes:
 "The Deadwood Stage"
 "Hive Full of Honey"
 "I Can Do Without You"
 "It's Harry I'm Planning to Marry"
 "The Windy City"
 "Keep It Under Your Hat"
 "Higher Than a Hawk"
 "A Woman's Touch"
 "The Black Hills of Dakota"
 "Secret Love"
The music was included in the album of the same name, though some of the songs from the album were re-recorded rather than taken from the soundtrack.

Accolades
The film is recognized by American Film Institute in these lists:
 2002: AFI's 100 Years...100 Passions – Nominated
 2003: AFI's 100 Years...100 Heroes & Villains:
 Calamity Jane – Nominated Hero
 2004: AFI's 100 Years...100 Songs:
 "Secret Love" – Nominated
 2006: AFI's Greatest Movie Musicals – Nominated

Subtext

The film has been popular with some lesbian audiences for its depiction of a character which can be read as lesbian, and was screened at the London Lesbian and Gay Film Festival in 2006. Film critic Jamie Stuart points to the film's lesbian overtones in Jane being played as a strong, independent woman who shares a house with a woman, the two of them painting "Calam and Katie" on its door. Armond White sees the film as approaching sexuality in a way that Hollywood was not openly able to do, describing the empathy and envy (despite this resulting from conflict over a man) between Jane and Katie's characters as "a landmark display of girl-on-girl attraction." Out magazine described the film's award-winning song, "Secret Love," as "the first gay anthem."

Accuracy
Though the film portrays Calamity Jane and Wild Bill Hickok as lovers, historians have found no proof that they were more than acquaintances. Jane claimed after Hickok's death that she had not only been his lover but also his wife and the mother of his child, but she offered no substantiation of her claims. Many of her contemporaries considered her a teller of tall tales (as portrayed in the film to humorous effect) who exaggerated her links to more famous frontier figures, and some insisted Hickok did not even particularly like her. But when she died decades after Hickok, friends buried her beside him at her request; four of the men on the self-appointed committee who planned Calamity's funeral (Albert Malter, Frank Ankeney, Jim Carson, and Anson Higby) later stated that, since Hickok had "absolutely no use" for Jane in this life, they decided to play a posthumous joke on him by laying her to rest by his side.

References

Sources

External links

 
 
 
 
 

1953 films
1950s LGBT-related films
1950s Western (genre) musical films
American Western (genre) musical films
American frontier
Cultural depictions of Calamity Jane
Cultural depictions of Wild Bill Hickok
Films adapted into plays
Films adapted into television shows
Films directed by David Butler
Films scored by Ray Heindorf
Films set in South Dakota
Films that won the Best Original Song Academy Award
LGBT-related musical films
Warner Bros. films
1950s English-language films
1950s American films